Lafey Constituency is a constituency in Mandera County, Kenya. It is one of six constituencies in the county. The town of Lafey is the capital of the constituency, and is located at around  3°55′N 41°50′E / 3.917°N 41.833°E, near the border with Somalia.

Area & Location :

From the plains of Bambiyaryar, to the fertile strip of Dawa Dubba, to the tips of Gari Hills, mountains to the banks of Dawa River, Lafey Constituency residents are known for their nomadic and pastoralist activities. Lafey constituency is a constituency in North Eastern Province, Kenya. Lafey town is the capital of the constituency. The town is located at around 3°55′N 41°50′E / 3.917°N 41.833°E, near the borders with Ethiopia and Somalia. It is located in an area prone to drought. From late 2005, there has been a severe famine. Lafey constituency is inhabited almost exclusively by ethnic Murules. A recent visit by Yussuf Maalim Abdi, a resident of Lafey Town, has revealed that the constituency has to some extent experienced improvement. Of significance is the establishment and acceptance of education as an important aspect. but still a lot needs to done.

Subdivision and Formation :
Lafey Constituency as a whole used to be part of the larger Mandera District that was divided into three constituencies, namely Mandera East, Mandera Central and Mandera West . This was followed subsequently by the creation of more districts which included Lafey District. However, following the promulgation of the new Kenya constitution in 2010, the numbers of constituencies were to be increased to 290. A formula has been prescribed in the Constitution on how these Constituencies were to be defined based on population numbers. The new list of constituencies issued at 18 November 2010 and published in the Kenya Gazette Supplement No.83 shows Lafey constituency as one of the newly created constituencies. Lafey Constituency is home to some ancient towns like Fino to name but a few. Lafey Boarding Primary School( which is known for producing great results In the annual K.C.P.E. and has frequently topped the entire province in terms of performance) is also in the province.

Education :
Lafey primary school is one of the best schools in Mandera county producing the leading KCPE students in the county. It has produced so many elites in Kenya and Diaspora.

List of primary schools in the constituency.
 Lafey primary school.
 Kahare primary school.
 Alungu primary school.
 Warankara primary school.
 Fino boarding primary school.
 sheikh barow primary school.
 Damasa primary school.
 Kabo primary school.
 Kamora Liban primary school.
 Gari primary school.
 Bambo primary school.
 Sala primary school.
 Jabi baar primary school

List of secondary schools.
 Lafey boys secondary school.
 Gari boys secondary school.
 Lafey pioneer.

Climate : 
The Climate of Lafey Constituency is an arid climate under the Köppen climate classification. Temperatures tend to be hot throughout the year. Daily temperatures are typically above 30 °C (86 °F) while at night, temperatures can fall to 20 °C (68 °F). Precipitation is extremely low, with the area receiving very minimal amount of rain. Droughts are not unusual, often resulting in significant loss of livestock to the inhabitants of the rural towns, many of whom remain nomads.

Inter-Clan conflict : 
The region around Mandera, known as the Mandera triangle, is prone to conflicts between the Somali clans who dominate the area. Clan clashes between the Garre and Murule has occurred in the borders of Murule -Garre along Elwak Police station along the mandera B9 highway. The conflicts were triggered by the December 19th, 2004 murder of a Murulle relief worker by Garre gunmen at Fino-Elwak road junction. This killing led to growing hostility between the two clans, which eventually degenerated into full-scale overt confrontation in January 2005. A number of issues have been advanced to explain the cause and genesis of this clan conflict. This has led for the UMUL accord in 2019-2020 which is yet to be published.

References
Constituencies in Kenya - Lafey Constituency

Constituencies in North Eastern Province (Kenya)
Constituencies in Mandera County